Christopher Winmond Royal (born January 19, 1983) is a former American football quarterback and defensive back and current cornerbacks coach for Morehead State University.

Early life
Royal attended South Lakes High School for 4 years, and Fork Union Military Academy for 1 year, where he played football and also lettered three years in track. He posted 3,050 career passing yards over two seasons with 38 touchdown passes, while rushing for 689 yards and 12 scores. He broke school records for passing yards in a game (304 with three TDs), as well as for passing yards in a season (1,600) and was named All-District as a quarterback following his junior and senior years. He was the top ranked quarterback and defensive back in the Northern Region of Virginia and was ranked statistically as the No. 2 quarterback in the state. He led the state in interceptions with eight his senior year, when he was selected team captain and was team offensive player of the year. As a defensive player, he recorded 47 tackles and 21 knockdowns as a senior. He was also an All-District performer in track and field, competing in the 200-meter dash, 100-meter dash, triple jump, long jump, high jump, 55-meter dash, 55-meter hurdles, 110 meter hurdles, and 300-meter hurdles. He was also an honor roll student during his senior year.

College career
Royal attended Marshall University in Huntington, West Virginia, where he played as a defensive back. As a junior in 2004, Chris led the Mid-American Conference with 6 interceptions.

Professional career
Royal was invited to the Washington Redskins rookie minicamp in 2006. He was the 2007 Spalding Rookie of the Year for the Wilkes-Barre/Scranton Pioneers of the AF2, after leading the league in interceptions with 14 regular season and 2 postseason (3 total touchdowns).

Royal was second in the Arena Football League in interceptions with 11 while playing for the Tulsa Talons. Royal currently holds franchise records for the Wilkes Barre-Scranton Pioneers and the Tulsa Talons for interceptions.

Personal
Chris Royal is the older brother of free agent NFL wide receiver Eddie Royal.

References

External links
Marshall Thundering Herd bio

1983 births
Living people
American football defensive backs
Georgia Force players
Glenville State Pioneers football coaches
Huntington Hammer players
Iowa Barnstormers players
Kansas City Command players
Lindenwood Lions football coaches
Marshall Thundering Herd football coaches
Marshall Thundering Herd football players
Milwaukee Mustangs (2009–2012) players
Morehead State Eagles football coaches
People from Reston, Virginia
Players of American football from Virginia
River City Raiders players
San Jose SaberCats players
Sportspeople from Fairfax County, Virginia
Tulsa Talons players
Utah Blaze players
Wilkes-Barre/Scranton Pioneers players